The 2014 NCAA Division III men's basketball tournament was a single-elimination tournament of 62 teams held to determine the men's collegiate basketball national champion of National Collegiate Athletic Association (NCAA) Division III.  It began on March 6, 2014, and concluded with the championship game on March 22, 2014, at the Salem Civic Center in Salem, Virginia.

The Wisconsin–Whitewater Warhawks defeated the Williams Ephs in the championship game, 75–73, to win their fourth national championship, their first since 2012. The two remaining semifinalists were the Illinois Wesleyan Titans and the Amherst Lord Jeffs.

Regional Rounds
* – Denotes overtime period

Regional 1 – Stevens Point, Wisconsin

Regional 2 – Bloomington, Illinois

Regional 3 – Amherst, Massachusetts

Regional 4 – Fredericksburg, Virginia

National Finals – Salem, Virginia

See also
2014 NCAA Division I men's basketball tournament
2014 NCAA Division II men's basketball tournament

References

NCAA Division III men's basketball tournament
Ncaa Tournament
NCAA Division III men's basketball tournament